Les Favoris de la lune (internationally released as Favorites of the Moon) is a 1984 French drama film written and directed by Otar Iosseliani.

Cast 
Katja Rupé as Claire
Alix de Montaigu as Delphine Laplace
François Michel as Philippe
Jean-Pierre Beauviala as Colas
Vincent Blanchet as terrorist
Otar Iosseliani as terrorist
Mathieu Amalric as Julien

Release
The film was released in France in 1985.

Reception
The film entered the competition at the 41st Venice International Film Festival, where it received the Special Jury Prize.

References

External links

1984 films
French drama films
Films directed by Otar Iosseliani
Venice Grand Jury Prize winners
1984 drama films
1980s French-language films
1980s French films